Hulsig railway station is a railway station located in the village of Hulsig south of Skagen in Vendsyssel, Denmark. The station serves the village of Hulsig as well as the nearby seaside resort of Kandestederne.

Hulsig station is located on the Skagensbanen railway line from Frederikshavn to Skagen between Frederikshavnsvej and Bunken railway halts. The station opened in 1890 where the railway line crossed the road to Kandestederne. The train services are currently operated by the railway company Nordjyske Jernbaner (NJ) which run frequent local train services between Skagen and Frederikshavn.

History 

The station was opened when the railway started in 1890. It was located near a small settlement where the railroad crossed the road to Kandestederne. The original station building was enlarged in 1921 based on designs by Ulrik Adolph Plesner.

In 1967, the station was set down to a halt. The former station building was sold in 1969.

Operations 
The train services are currently operated by the railway company Nordjyske Jernbaner (NJ) which run frequent local train services from Skagen station to Frederikshavn station with onward connections to the rest of Denmark.

See also
 List of railway stations in Denmark

References

Citations

Bibliography

External links

 Nordjyske Jernbaner – Danish railway company operating in North Jutland Region
 Danske Jernbaner – website with information on railway history in Denmark
 Nordjyllands Jernbaner – website with information on railway history in North Jutland
 Skagensiden.dk – website with information on Skagen

Railway stations in the North Jutland Region
Railway stations opened in 1890
Buildings and structures in Skagen
Ulrik Plesner railway stations
Railway stations in Denmark opened in the 19th century